Sonck, Sonk or Sønck is the surname of the following people
Grethe Sønck (1929–2010), Danish actress and singer
Hannes Sonck (1919–1952), Finnish athlete
Lars Sonck (1870–1956), Finnish architect
Martinus Sonck (ca. 1590–1625), first Dutch Governor of Formosa
Wesley Sonck (born 1978), Belgian football player